Marguerite Roberts (September 21, 1905 – February 17, 1989) was an American screenwriter, one of the highest paid in the 1930s. After she and her husband John Sanford refused to testify in 1951 before the House Un-American Activities Committee, she was blacklisted for nine years and unable to get work in Hollywood. She was hired again in 1962 by Columbia Pictures.

Biography
Roberts was born in 1905 in Clarks, Nebraska.

In the early 1920s, Roberts and her first husband traveled in the South selling imitation pearls. In California when their business failed, she found work at an El Centro local newspaper, The Imperial Valley Press. She moved to Hollywood and became a secretary for 20th Century Fox in 1926, and sold her first script in 1931. In 1933, she collaborated on the screenplay of Sailor's Luck, directed by Raoul Walsh. That year she signed the first of a string of contracts with MGM, which made her one of the best paid screenwriters of Hollywood at $2500 per week. She explained how she preferred to write scenarios for tough men: "I was weaned on stories about gunfighters and their doings, and I know all the lingo too. My grandfather came West as far as Colorado by covered wagon. He was a sheriff in the state's wildest days."

Roberts was working for Paramount Pictures in 1936, where she met the writer John Sanford. They married two years later. After Sanford joined the Communist Party in 1939, Roberts followed him but left in 1947. She encouraged him to pursue his independent writing and supported them both by her screenwriting.

Blacklisted in 1951 for refusing to answer the House Un-American Activities Committee, Roberts had to wait nine years before working again in Hollywood. In 1957 she and Sanford moved to Montecito, California.

In 1962, she was hired by Columbia Pictures to work on Diamond Head (1963). She also wrote the screenplay for True Grit (1969), which earned its actor, John Wayne, his only Oscar.  She wrote steadily through the next decade and had many of her films produced.

She died on February 17, 1989, at 83 years old from arteriosclerosis.

Filmography

1933	Sailor's Luck
1933	Jimmy and Sally
1934	Peck's Bad Boy
1935	College Scandal
1935	Men Without Names
1935	The Last Outpost
1936	Rose Bowl
1936	Forgotten Faces
1936	Florida Special
1936	Hollywood Boulevard
1937	Wild Money	(uncredited)
1937	Turn Off the Moon
1938	Meet the Girls
1939	They Shall Have Music	(uncredited)
1940	Escape
1941	Ziegfeld Girl
1941	Honky Tonk
1942	Somewhere I'll Find You
1944	Dragon Seed
1946	Undercurrent (uncredited)
1947	Desire Me
1947	The Sea of Grass
1948	If Winter Comes'''
1949	The Bribe1950	Ambush1951	Soldiers Three1952	Ivanhoe (credit restored)
1953	The Girl Who Had Everything (uncredited)
1962	The Main Attraction (uncredited)
1962	Diamond Head1963	Rampage1965	Love Has Many Faces1968	5 Card Stud1969	True Grit1970	Norwood1971	Red Sky at Morning1971	Shoot Out'' (last film)

References

External links

1905 births
1989 deaths
American women screenwriters
Hollywood blacklist
Victims of McCarthyism
People from Greeley, Colorado
Burials at Santa Barbara Cemetery
20th-century American women writers
20th-century American writers
20th-century American screenwriters